The 1947 South American Championships in Athletics  were held in Rio de Janeiro, Brazil, between 25 April and 3 May.

Medal summary

Men's events

Women's events

Medal table

External links
 Men Results – GBR Athletics
 Women Results – GBR Athletics
 Medallists

S
South American Championships in Athletics
A
International athletics competitions hosted by Brazil
1947 in South American sport
1947 in Brazilian sport
Athletics in Rio de Janeiro (city)